Kotz or Kötz may refer to:

People with that name
Brad Kotz, American lacrosse player at Syracuse University from 1982 to 1985
Dorothy Kotz (born 1944), Australian politician
Eric Kotz, South Australian mariner and author
H. David Kotz (born 1966), a director in the Financial Institutions practice at Berkeley Research Group, former Inspector General of the U.S. Securities and Exchange Commission
Hein Kötz (born 1935), German jurist, former Director of the MPI-PRIV, the Bucerius Law School and Vice President of the DFG
John Kotz (basketball) (1919–1999), American basketball player
John Kotz (politician) (1930–2014), British Labour Party politician
Nick Kotz (1932-2020), American journalist, author, and historian
Richard Kotz (1886–1960), German Wehrmacht officer during World War II
Samuel Kotz (1930–2010), engineering professor
Tadeusz Kotz (1913–2008), Polish pilot and fighter ace of World War II

Other
Kötz, municipality in Bavaria, Germany
Kötz (Günz), a river of Bavaria, Germany, tributary of the Günz
KOTZ, non-commercial radio station in Kotzebue, Alaska
Francis Kotz Farm, also known as The Kotz Place, a historic home located near Wardensville, West Virginia, USA